1370 Aluminium alloy is primarily aluminium (>=99.7%) alloyed with small amounts of boron, chromium, copper, gallium, iron, magnesium, manganese, silicon, vanadium and zinc.

Properties of Aluminium alloy

References 

 Aluminium alloys